St Stephen's Church is the parish church of Acomb, a suburb of York in England.

A church has lain on the site since the Saxon period, and some remains of the Saxon church were uncovered in 1830.  By the time of the Norman Conquest, it was a possession of York Minster.  In 1228, it was transferred to the Treasurer of the Minster, and a vicarage was built in 1313.  It was transferred to the Crown in 1547.

By 1830, the church was ruinous, so from 1831 to 1832 it was rebuilt, to a design by G. T. Andrews.  It seated 338 worshippers, partly in two galleries.  Cruciform in plan, it was constructed in Tadcaster limestone with a slate roof.  The original chancel was retained, but it was rebuilt in 1851.  A vestry was added in 1889, and the following year, an east window was added.  In the 20th-century, a porch was added, as was a lean-to on the north wall.

In 1848, it was described as "an elegant structure with a graceful spire, and, standing on the highest ground in the vicinity of York, [it] has a very picturesque appearance".  The Royal Commission on Historic Monuments was more critical, describing it as "ostensibly in the Early English style, [but it] shows no real appreciation of mediaeval architecture".

The roof was rebuilt in 1952, and in 1954, a peal of bells was installed, cast in 1770 for St Mary Bishophill Senior.  In 1983, the building was Grade II listed.  The church suffered a fire in 1992 and was restored afterwards, but was restored soon afterwards, and many of its fixtures and fittings survived.  These include stained glass, the oldest of which was made by Edmund Gyles in 1662, depicted the arms of Charles II of England.  The arms of William IV are displayed on a panel in the porch.

References

External links

Acomb
Acomb
19th-century Church of England church buildings